Alert Level System may refer to:

COVID-19 
 COVID-19 Alert Levels System, Philippines
 Local COVID-19 Alert Levels, England
 COVID-19 alert levels in New Zealand

Volcanoes 
 Volcanic Alert Level, New Zealand
 Vanuatu Volcanic Alert Level
 Cascade Ranges volcano warning system, United States

Other uses 
 Terror Alert Level, U.S. Homeland Security
 MARSEC alert levels, U.S. Coast Guard